The U.S. Dollar Index (USDX, DXY, DX, or, informally, the "Dixie") is an index (or measure) of the value of the United States dollar relative to a basket of foreign currencies, often referred to as a basket of U.S. trade partners' currencies.  The Index goes up when the U.S. dollar gains "strength" (value) when compared to other currencies.

The index is designed, maintained, and published by ICE (Intercontinental Exchange, Inc.), with the name "U.S. Dollar Index" a registered trademark.

It is a weighted geometric mean of the dollar's value relative to following select currencies:

 Euro (EUR),            57.6% weight
 Japanese yen (JPY),     13.6% weight
 Pound sterling (GBP),  11.9% weight
 Canadian dollar (CAD), 9.1% weight
 Swedish krona (SEK),   4.2% weight
 Swiss franc (CHF),      3.6% weight

History
USDX started in March 1973, soon after the dismantling of the Bretton Woods system. At its start, the value of the U.S. Dollar Index was 100.000. It has since traded as high as 164.7200 in February 1985, and as low as 70.698 on March 16, 2008.

The make up of the "basket" has been altered only once, when several European currencies were subsumed by the euro at the start of 1999. Some commentators have said that the make up of the "basket" is overdue for revision as China, Mexico, South Korea and Brazil are major trading partners presently which are not part of the index whereas Sweden and Switzerland are continuing as part of the index.

Trade weighted USD Index

The trade-weighted US dollar index is a currency index created by the Federal Reserve to measure the exchange rate of the United States Dollar compared to the nations that it trades with the most, the more trade a country has with the United States the more that exchange rate weighs on the index. The index was created in 1998  during the creation of the Euro.

Quotes
ICE provides live feeds for Dow Futures that appear on Bloomberg.com and CNN Money.  USDX is updated whenever U.S. Dollar markets are open, which is from Sunday evening New York City local time (early Monday morning Asia time) for 24 hours a day to late Friday afternoon New York City local time.

Calculation
The U.S. Dollar Index is calculated with this formula:
 =  ×  ×  ×  ×  ×  ×

Trading
US Dollar Index futures are traded for 21 hours a day on the ICE platform with futures having a March/June/September/December quarterly expiration cycle. It is also available indirectly in exchange-traded funds (ETFs), options, contracts for difference and mutual funds.

See also 
 Trade-weighted US dollar index
 Special drawing rights
 Dow Jones FXCM Dollar Index
 Wall Street Journal Dollar Index
 1976 sterling crisis

References

External links
USDX Quotes

1973 introductions
Economic indicators of United States currencies
Foreign exchange market